This is a list of contestants who have appeared on the American television series, The Amazing Race. Contestants, who typically have a pre-existing relationship, form a team and race around the world against other teams to claim a grand prize of 1 million USD. The original American series premiered in 2001. As of 2022, there had been 33 seasons aired with locations spanning all six inhabited continents. In total, 699 contestants have appeared in the series, with veteran contestants having competed on The Amazing Race 11: All-Stars in 2007, on The Amazing Race 18: Unfinished Business, on The Amazing Race 24: All-Stars and on The Amazing Race 31 (which featured teams of contestants who had previously competed on Big Brother, The Amazing Race and Survivor). The eighth season, The Amazing Race 8: Family Edition, featured 10 teams of four family members, including children as young as 8, while the twenty-ninth season featured 22 contestants who were all complete strangers.

Key legend:

Seasons 1–4 (2001–2003)

The presented information was accurate at the time of filming.

Seasons 5–8 (2004–2005)
The presented information was accurate at the time of filming.

Seasons 9–11 (2006–2007)

The presented information was accurate at the time of filming.

Seasons 12–15 (2007–2009)

The presented information was accurate at the time of filming.

Seasons 16–18 (2010–2011)

The presented information was accurate at the time of filming.

Seasons 19–21 (2011–2012)

The presented information was accurate at the time of filming.

Seasons 22–24 (2013–2014)

The presented information was accurate at the time of filming.

Seasons 25–28 (2014–2016)

The presented information was accurate at the time of filming.

Seasons 29–31 (2017–2019)

The presented information was accurate at the time of filming.

Seasons 32–present (2020–present)

The presented information was accurate at the time of filming.

Notes

References

 
 
 
 
 
 
 
 

Amazing Race (American TV series), The